Snipe World Championships
Medalists in sailing